Wokingham is a town in Berkshire, England.
 
Wokingham may also refer to:

 Wokingham and Emmbrook F.C., formerly Wokingham Town, an English football club
 Wokingham railway station
 Wokingham (UK Parliament constituency)
 Borough of Wokingham, a local government district
 Wokingham Rural District , a former local government district

See also

Woking, a town in Surrey